Vallda Golf & Country Club is a golf club located in Kungsbacka 30 km south of Gothenburg in Sweden. It hosted the Scandinavian Mixed in 2021, a joint event on the European Tour and Ladies European Tour.

History
Plans to create a classic Scottish heathland golf course near Gothenburg were conceived in the mid-1990s and 86 hectares of meadowland surrounded by oak forest was acquired in the Vallda Valley, outside Kungsbacka. Golf course architect Martin Hawtree was commissioned to design the course drawing on inspiration from the legendary British golf courses of the 1920s, and the 18-hole course in open links-style layout was completed in July 2009.

Svensk Golf, official publication of the Swedish Golf Federation, in 2020 ranked the course #7 in Sweden using the Golf Digest methodology.

In 2021 the club hosted its first major event, the Scandinavian Mixed hosted by Henrik Stenson and Annika Sörenstam. Sanctioned jointly by the European Tour and Ladies European Tour, the tournament for the first time brought together 78 men and 78 women to compete in the same tournament for the same prize money. Official World Golf Ranking points were offered for both tours, along with points toward the European Tour's and LET's respective season-long Order of Merit competitions.

Tournaments hosted

Professional tournaments

See also
List of golf courses in Sweden

References

External links

Golf clubs and courses in Sweden